PSS Kedam is a  patrol boat, donated by the Nippon Foundation and Sasakawa Peace Foundation to Palau, to help it patrol its exclusive economic zone.

History

The vessel arrived on 22 December 2017, to join the slightly smaller  , donated by Australia in 1996.  The vessel cost US$30 million. The donors also constructed a berth to moor and maintain the vessel, and committed to cover the vessel's fuel and maintenance costs until 2027.

Kedam was commissioned on 13 February 2018.  Dignitaries attending included President Thomas Remengesau Jr., Vice President and Minister of Justice Raynold Oilouch and Mitsuyuki Unno Executive Director of the Nippon Foundation.

Kedam is staffed by a crew of 15. The vessel is named after the "Great Frigate Bird of Palau".

References

External links
 The Nippon Foundation to Handover Patrol Vessel, Marine Law Administrative Building, and Vessel Berth to the Republic of Palau

2017 ships
Patrol boats
Naval ships of Palau